Charles Alfred Huntley-Robertson (born Carlos Alfredo Huntley Robertson; 23 March 1908 – 1982) was a British-Argentine rugby union player. He was the Captain of Los Pumas in 1932.

Career 

Huntley-Robertson was born in Lima, Peru, to a South American mother, Alida Pendavis, and Capt. James Huntley-Robertson, who was born in Miraflores, Mexico to a Scottish father, John Moir Robertson, and Peruvian mother, Paz Besseser de Robertson. James Huntley-Robertson served with the 2nd Mounted Infantry Contingent from Western Australia and the Bushveldt Carbineers in the Second Boer War, and then worked on the railways in Chile, Peru and Argentina prior to the First World War, when he was awarded the Military Cross for his service in the Battle of the Somme.

Though he was born Carlos Alfredo, he used the name Charles Alfred. He started his rugby playing career at Buenos Aires Cricket & Rugby Club.

On July 16, 1932, Huntley-Robertson made its debut in the Argentina national team, playing his first Test match against South Africa, with a score 42-0 in favor of the Springboks. On July 23, had played their second game against the Springboks with a victory of South African team by 34-3. Both matches were played at the stadium of the Club Ferro Carril Oeste.

In 1936, Huntley-Robertson was the Coach of the national team together Luis Cilley and Edmundo Stanfield.

In 1940, Huntley-Robertson married Barbara Hiroth Verity in London.

References

External links 
springbokrugby.webs.com
en.espn.co.uk

1908 births
1982 deaths
Sportspeople from Lima
Argentina international rugby union players
Argentine rugby union players
Argentine people of English descent
Argentine people of Scottish descent
Peruvian people of English descent
Peruvian people of Scottish descent
English rugby union players
Peruvian emigrants to Argentina
Argentine emigrants to the United Kingdom